ʿUmar Dīn, reigned 1526–1553, was a sultan ruling over the Sultanate of Adal in the Horn of Africa. He was the younger brother of Abu Bakr ibn Muhammad. According to historian Richard Pankhurst, Umar was of Harari background.

Reign
After his brother Abu Bakr ibn Muhammad was killed by Imam Ahmad ibn Ibrahim al-Ghazi (1506–1543) in 1526, Umar Din was made sultan by Imam Ahmad. He ruled as a puppet king, with Imam Ahmad wielding true power.

He was succeeded by his son Ali ibn Umar Din in 1553, who in turn was succeeded by his brother Barakat ibn Umar Din, the last member of the Walashmaʿ dynasty, in 1555.

Notes

Works cited

16th-century monarchs in Africa
Sultans of the Adal Sultanate
16th-century Somalian people